Anastrephoides is a genus of tephritid  or fruit flies in the family Tephritidae.

Anastrephoides species

 Anastrephoides gerckei (Hendel, 1927)

 Anastrephoides matsumurai (Shiraki, 1933)

References

Trypetinae
Tephritidae genera